Television in Oman. Around 48% of the households receive television on terrestrials, and 48% on satellite. There were six free-to-air channels headquartered in Oman at the end of 2011, four of these privately owned. Only 7% of households have access to Pay television. 

A reform in 2004 ended the state’s monopoly on television broadcasting. The first independent TV station Majan TV launched in 2009. In 2011, Jai Hind TV was launched in Oman.

References

 
Television stations